Fuzuli or Fizuli may refer to:

People
 Fuzuli (writer) (Mahammad bin Suleyman, 1483–1556), Azerbaijani poet, writer and thinker
 Fizuli Mammedov (born 1977), Azerbaijani footballer
 Fizuli Alakbarov (born 1958), Azerbaijani politician

Places
 Fuzuli (city), a city in Azerbaijan named for the Azerbaijani writer
 Fuzuli District, Azerbaijan
 Füzuli, Samukh, a village and municipality in the Samukh Rayon of Azerbaijan
 Füzuli, Shamkir, a village in the municipality of Yeni yol in the Shamkir Rayon of Azerbaijan